Yurii Olehovych Lubkovych (31 May 1989 – 18 January 2023) was a Ukrainian diplomat who served as the Secretary of State of the Ministry of Internal Affairs from 2021 until his death in 2023.

Biography
Lubkovych graduated from the Erasmus University Rotterdam in the Netherlands in 2010 (majoring in business). He studied at the West Ukrainian National University where he received his bachelor's degree in management in 2010 and his master's degree in management of foreign economic activities in 2011.

He held civil service positions for 10 years. He had experience in management positions in the Secretariat of the Cabinet of ministers of Ukraine and the Apparatus of the Verkhovna Rada.

Lubkovych also attended special training courses for public managers at the Secretariat of the Government of Canada and Nanyang Technological University in Singapore.

Death 
Lubkovych, along with the Minister of Interior, Denys Monastyrsky and deputy minister of internal affairs Yevhen Yenin, were killed in a helicopter crash on 18 January 2023 in Brovary, an eastern suburb of the capital Kyiv. The helicopter hit a kindergarten as it crashed, and a child was among the 14 killed. At least 25 others were injured.

References 

1989 births
2023 deaths
Ukrainian diplomats
21st-century diplomats
People killed in the 2022 Russian invasion of Ukraine
Victims of aviation accidents or incidents in Ukraine
Victims of helicopter accidents or incidents
Victims of aviation accidents or incidents in 2023
Erasmus University Rotterdam alumni
Ternopil National Economic University alumni
People from Ternopil